This is a list of awards and nominations received by American R&B/pop quartet En Vogue.

American Music Awards
The American Music Awards is an annual awards ceremony created by Dick Clark in 1973. 

|-
|rowspan="2"|  ||  || Favorite Dance New Artist || 
|-
| "Hold On" || Favorite Dance Single || 
|-
|rowspan="2"|  ||  || Favorite Soul/R&B Band, Duo or Group || 
|-
| Funky Divas || Favorite Soul/R&B Album || 
|-
|rowspan="1"|  ||  || Favorite Soul/R&B Band, Duo or Group || 
|-
|rowspan="1"|  || "Whatta Man" (with Salt-n-Pepa) || Favorite Soul/R&B Single || 
|-
|rowspan="1"|  ||  || Favorite Soul/R&B Band, Duo or Group || 
|-

Billboard Music Awards
The Billboard Music Awards are sponsored by Billboard magazine to honor artists based on Billboard Year-End Charts. The award ceremony was held from 1990 to 2007. Before and after that time span, winners have been announced by Billboard, both in the press and as part of their year-end issue.  The award returned in 2011.

|-
|rowspan="2"|1990
|rowspan="2"|"Hold On"
|Top R&B Single
|
|-
|Top Dance Sales 12" Single
|
|-
|rowspan="2"| 1997 ||  || Top Hot 100 Singles Artist Duo/Group || 
|-
| "Don't Let Go (Love)" || Top Soundtrack Single || 
|-
|}

Grammy Awards
The Grammy Awards are awarded annually by the National Academy of Recording Arts and Sciences established in 1959.

|-
|rowspan="1"|  || Born to Sing || Best R&B Performance Duo or Group with Vocal || 
|-
|rowspan="3"|  || Funky Divas || Best R&B Performance Duo or Group with Vocal || 
|-
|rowspan="2"| "Free Your Mind" || Best Rock Performance Duo or Group with Vocal ||
|-
|Best Music Video Short Form || 
|-
|rowspan="1"|  || "Give It Up, Turn It Loose" || Best R&B Performance Duo or Group with Vocal || 
|-
|rowspan="1"|  || "Whatta Man" (with Salt-n-Pepa) || Best R&B Performance Duo or Group with Vocal || 
|-
|rowspan="1"|  || "Don't Let Go (Love)" || Best R&B Performance Duo or Group with Vocal || 
|-

MTV Video Music Awards
The MTV Video Music Awards were established in 1984 by MTV to celebrate the top music videos of the year.

|-
|rowspan="6"| 1992 
|rowspan="6"| "My Lovin' (You're Never Gonna Get It)"  
| Best Group Video  
|
|-
| Best Dance Video 
|
|-
| Best Direction in a Video 
|
|-
| Best Choreography in a Video 
|
|-
| Best Editing in a Video 
|
|-
| Best Cinematography in a Video 
|
|-
|rowspan="8"| 1993 
|rowspan="8"| "Free Your Mind"  
| Video of the Year  
|
|-
| Best Group Video  
|
|-
| Best R&B Video  
|
|-
| Best Dance Video
|
|-
| Best Direction in a Video 
|
|-
| Best Choreography in a Video
|
|-
| Best Cinematography in a Video
|
|-
| Viewer's Choice  
|
|-
|rowspan="3"| 1994 
|rowspan="3"| "Whatta Man"  
| Best R&B Video  
|
|-
| Best Dance Video
|
|-
| Best Choreography in a Video
|
|-
| 1994 
| "Runaway Love" 
| Best Dance Video  
|

Soul Train Music Awards
The Soul Train Music Awards is an annual award show aired in national broadcast syndication that honors the best in African American music and entertainment established in 1987.  

|-
|rowspan="5"| 1991 
|rowspan="3"| "Hold On" 
| Best R&B/Soul Song of the Year 
| 
|-
| Best R&B/Soul Music Video 
| 
|-
| Best R&B/Soul Single Group, Band or Duo
| 
|-
| || Best R&B/Soul New Artist 
|  
|-
| Born to Sing || Best R&B/Soul Album Group, Band or Duo 
| 
|-
|rowspan="5"| 1993 
| || Sammy Davis Jr. Entertainer of the Year 
|  
|-
|rowspan="2"| "My Lovin' (You're Never Gonna Get It)" 
| Best R&B Song of the Year
| 
|-
| Best R&B/Soul Single Group, Band or Duo
| 
|-
|rowspan="1"| "Giving Him Something He Can Feel" 
| Best R&B Music Video
| 
|-
|rowspan="1"| Funky Divas 
| Best R&B/Soul Album Group, Band or Duo
| 
|-

Soul Train Lady of Soul Awards
The Soul Train Lady of Soul Awards is an awards show that honors the accomplishments of women in the music industry established in 1995.

|-
|1997
|"Don't Let Go (Love)"
|Best R&B/Soul Single Group, Band or Duo
|
|-
|1998
|EV3
|Best R&B/Soul Album Group, Band or Duo
|
|-
|2001
|Masterpiece Theatre
|Best R&B/Soul Album Group, Band or Duo
|
|-

References 

Lists of awards received by American musician
Lists of awards received by musical group